Edward J. Rasimus (September 29, 1942 – January 30, 2013) was a United States Air Force Major and a veteran fighter pilot of the Vietnam war. Rasimus flew more than 250 combat missions in  F-105 Thunderchief and F-4 Phantom II fighters during the conflict and received the Silver Star, the Distinguished Flying Cross five times, and numerous Air Medals. Rasimus was an award-winning author residing in Northern Texas.

Published Books
 Fighter Pilot: The Memoirs of Legendary Ace Robin Olds - Co-authored by Robin Olds and Christina Olds -  - St. Martin's Press (April 13, 2010)
 Palace Cobra: A Fighter Pilot in the Vietnam Air War -  - St. Martin's Paperbacks (August 28, 2007) (Hardcover edition, April 2006, St. Martin's Press)
 Phantom Flights, Bangkok Nights: A Vietnam War Pilot's Second Tour -  - Smithsonian Books (November 30, 2005) (Never Published, released as Palace Cobra in April 2006, hardcover from St. Martin's Press)
 When Thunder Rolled: An F-105 Pilot Over North Vietnam -  - Presidio Press (September 28, 2004) (Hardcover edition, January 2003, Smithsonian Institution Press)

References

Aviation writers
United States Air Force officers
United States Air Force airmen
Recipients of the Silver Star
Recipients of the Air Medal
Recipients of the Distinguished Flying Cross (United States)
American male writers
1942 births
2013 deaths